Estadio Juan Francisco Barraza is a multi-purpose stadium in San Miguel, El Salvador.
It is currently used mostly for football matches and is the home stadium of C.D. Águila and C.D. Dragón. It is named after the 1950s star Juan Francisco "Cariota" Barraza in 1982. The stadium holds 10,000 people.

History
Construction began in November 1956 and was under the direction of Pablo Paredes Lemus and Cia. After 3 years of building, The stadium was opened and held its very first game on November 15, 1959. This day saw Honduran Club Deportivo Olimpia play against Águila and drew 1-1.
In 1982, 26 years after its construction, the Aguila board, decided to change its name to Estadio Juan Francisco Barraza, after the iconic footballer in El Salvador.

References

1959 establishments in El Salvador
Football venues in El Salvador
Multi-purpose stadiums in El Salvador
Sports venues completed in 1959